The Ivory Coast national under-18 and under-19 basketball team is a national basketball team of the Ivory Coast, governed by the Fédération Ivoirienne de Basket-Ball.
It represents the country in international under-18 and under-19 (under age 19 and under age 18) basketball competitions.

See also
Ivory Coast national basketball team
Ivory Coast national under-17 basketball team
Ivory Coast women's national under-19 basketball team

References

External links
Archived records of Ivory Coast team participations

Ivory Coast national basketball team
Men's national under-19 basketball teams